BAP Almirante Grau (CLM-81) is a  cruiser that served in the Dutch and Peruvian navies. Completed for the Dutch in 1953 as HNLMS De Ruyter (C801), she was acquired by Peru in 1973 and served as fleet flagship. Almirante Grau underwent a major modernization program between 1985 and 1988 during which she was fitted with new weapons and electronics. She was the last gun cruiser in service in any navy before being decommissioned on 26 September 2017. In 2019, it was to be said that she would be preserved as a museum ship. However, it was later announced on 14 February 2022 that the ship would put up for sale with an asking price of 4,180,000 soles (1,112,520 USD).

Construction 
De Ruyter was laid down by the Royal Netherlands Navy on 5 September 1939 as the cruiser HNLMS De Zeven Provinciën at the Wilton-Fijenoord shipyard at Schiedam. She and her sister-ship, later , were intended to replace the two s in the Dutch East Indies. At the German invasion of the Netherlands in May 1940 little had been constructed.  The Kriegsmarine intended to complete her as the training cruiser KH 1 but construction was slow and she was not launched until 24 December 1944, with the intent by then to use her as a blockship in the Nieuwe Waterweg, the approaches to Rotterdam.

After the liberation of the Netherlands, the Navy completed De Zeven Provinciën with modifications, and she was commissioned as HNLMS De Ruyter (C801) on 18 November 1953.

Royal Netherlands Navy service 
In Dutch service both ships participated in several NATO exercises, and were frequently used as flagships for different naval task forces. Between 1962 and 1964, De Zeven Provinciën underwent a refit which included the removal of the two aft turrets and the installation of a RIM-2 Terrier SAM system, but lack of funds precluded the same modifications from being carried out in De Ruyter. After two decades in service, she was decommissioned on 16 October 1972.

Peruvian Navy service 
The Peruvian Navy bought De Ruyter on 7 March 1973 as a counter to the acquisition of the Swedish cruiser  by the Chilean Navy. Commissioned on 23 May 1973 as Almirante Grau, in honor of the Peruvian Admiral Miguel Grau, the ship arrived at her new homeport of Callao on 11 July 1973. She was designated fleet flagship in succession to another cruiser of the same name (the  former ), which was renamed .

Modernization 
From 1985 until 1988, she underwent a major modernization program by Amsterdam Naval Services (ANS) at its shipyard in Amsterdam, during which she was denominated Proyecto de Modernización 01 (Modernization Project 01) or PM-01. Her role as flagship was assumed by her sistership  as Almirante Grau. Both ships regained their former names when the former De Ruyter returned to Callao on 15 February 1988.

The upgrade program carried out in the Netherlands included the following:
 Fitting of the Signaal SEWACO Foresee PE combat management system
 Fitting of a Signaal DA-08 surface-search radar
 Fitting of a Signaal LW-08 air-search radar
 Fitting of a Decca 1226 navigation radar
 Fitting of a Signaal STIR-24 fire-control radar
 Fitting of a Signaal WM-25 fire-control radar
 Fitting of two Signaal LIROD-8 optronic directors
 Fitting of the Signaal Rapids ESM system
 Fitting of the CME Scimitar ECM system
 Fitting of two Matra Défense Dagaie decoy launchers
 Fitting of one Matra Défense Sagaie decoy launcher
 Fitting of a Link Y data link
 Fitting (towers) of two Bofors signal amplifiers, including aiming and firing limitation
 Removal of four twin Bofors 57/60 mm gun mountings
 Removal of the CWE-610 hull sonar

Further work was carried out by SIMA dockyards in Callao as follows: 
 Eight Otomat Mk 2 SSMs were fitted in 1993
 Two OTO Melara Twin 40L70 DARDO compact gun mountings were fitted in 1996, replacing four single Bofors 40/70 mm gun mountings

The LW-08 radar was later replaced by an AN/SPS-6, the former being installed in the frigate  (FM-51) in 2003.

Decommissioning
Almirante Grau was decommissioned on 26 September 2017. She was the last gun cruiser in service in any navy, although its main armament was supplemented with Otomat anti-ship missiles. She was replaced by the BAP Montero, now known as BAP Almirante Grau.

On 9 August 2019, the Peruvian Navy announced that she would be preserved as a museum ship in Lima, though in February 2022, the ship was placed on sale. In July 2022 it was reported that she was to be scrapped.

Gallery

References

Sources
 Baker III, Arthur D., The Naval Institute Guide to Combat Fleets of the World 2002-2003. Naval Institute Press, 2002.
 Rodríguez Asti, John, Cruceros. Buques de la Marina de Guerra del Perú desde 1884. Dirección de Intereses Marítimos, 2000. 
 
 
 Jane's Fighting Ships 2011-2012.
 Unexpected end: old cruiser De Ruyter on its way to scrap  from MarineSchepen

External links

De Zeven Provinciën-class cruisers of the Peruvian Navy
1944 ships
Ships built by Wilton-Fijenoord
Naval ships of the Netherlands captured by Germany during World War II
Cold War cruisers of the Netherlands